Thomas Holland  (born 5 January 1968) is an English author who has published best-selling books on topics including classical and medieval history and the origins of Islam. He has worked with the BBC to create and host historical television documentaries, and presents the radio series Making History.

Early life and education
Holland was born in Oxfordshire and brought up in the village of Broad Chalke near Salisbury, Wiltshire, England, the elder of two sons. His younger brother James Holland is also an author whose focus is World War II. He has said that his two passions as a child were dinosaurs and ancient civilizations: "I had the classic small boy's fascination with dinosaurs – because they're glamorous, dangerous and extinct – and essentially the appeal of the empires of antiquity is much the same. There's a splendour and a terror about them that appealed to me – and that kind of emotional attachment is something that stays with you."

Holland attended Chafyn Grove preparatory school and the independent Canford School in Dorset. He then went on to Queens' College, Cambridge, graduating with a 'Double First' (first-class honours in both parts I and II of the course of study in the English Tripos). He began working on a doctoral dissertation on Lord Byron, at Oxford University, but soon quit after deciding that he was "fed up with universities and fed up with being poor" and instead began working.

Writing career

Novels
Holland's first books were Gothic horror novels about vampires, set in various time periods throughout history.

His first novel, The Vampyre: Being the True Pilgrimage of George Gordon, Sixth Lord Byron (1995), drew on his knowledge of Lord Byron from his university studies and recast the 19th-century poet as a vampire.  It was re-titled Lord of the Dead: The Secret History of Byron for the 1996 U.S. release.  The Los Angeles Times called it "a good vampire yarn—elevated and elegant enough to make you feel you needn't conceal it behind the dust jacket of some self-help work, yet happily gory and perilous" although they felt "the newly plowed plot ground is sometimes hurried through as if to get to the scholarly stuff, where the author feels perhaps on more solid ground." Its sequel, Supping with Panthers, was published in 1996 (it was also re-titled for the U.S. release, to Slave of My Thirst).

Holland stayed with the supernatural horror genre for his next few books, continuing to use his knowledge of ancient cultures and settings. In Attis (1996), he took historical figures from the ancient Roman Republic like Pompey and the poet Catullus and put them in a modern setting among a string of brutal murders. He set 1997's Deliver Us From Evil in 17th-century England, with a man named Faustus leading an army of the undead. 1999's Sleeper in the Sands is set in Egypt, starting with the discovery of the Tomb of Tutankhamun in 1922 and travelling backward in time as a deadly secret is unveiled.

Holland's last novel to date departed from the supernatural genre. The Bone Hunter (1999) is a thriller, set in the United States, about the rivalry between two 19th-century paleontologists around whom people begin dying.

Historical non-fiction books
While doing research for The Bone Hunter, Holland read From Alexander to Actium by historian Peter Green and his childhood passion for ancient history and civilisations was reignited.  He gave up writing fiction and turned to writing history.

His first book of history, Rubicon: The Last Years of the Roman Republic, was published in 2003 and garnered positive reviews. It was called "gripping and hugely entertaining" by The Sunday Times, "informative, balanced and accessible" by BookPage, and "a model of exactly how a popular history of the classical world should be written" by The Guardian. Rubicon won the 2004 Hessell-Tiltman Prize, awarded to the best work of non-fiction of historical content.

Persian Fire: The First World Empire and the Battle for the West (2005) is an account of the 5th-century B.C. Greco-Persian Wars. It was reviewed positively by Paul Cartledge, a professor of Greek history at Cambridge University, for The Independent: "If Persian Fire does not win the Samuel Johnson Prize, there is no justice in this world." Writing in The Sunday Telegraph, historian Dominic Sandbrook called it "riveting" and praised the "enormous strengths" of the author. It won the Anglo-Hellenic League's 2006 Runciman Award.

Millennium: The End of the World and the Forging of Christendom (2008) examines the two centuries on either side of the seminal year 1000 A.D., and how Western Europe ascended out of the Dark Ages to become a leading world civilization once again. Noel Malcolm reviewed it for The Daily Telegraph and called it "a tremendously good read" but criticised the lack of detail about historical evidence and Holland's "elevated" style of prose. Christina Hardyment, reviewing it for The Independent, praised Holland's writing style, saying he "excels at narration, never jogging when he can gallop ... His highly individual road map to the hitherto 'dark ages' is written with forceful – and convincing – panache."

Holland's book on the rise of Islam, In the Shadow of the Sword: The Battle for Global Empire and the End of the Ancient World (2012), was called "a work of impressive sensitivity and scholarship" by The Daily Telegraph and "a book of extraordinary richness ... For Tom Holland has an enviable gift for summoning up the colour, the individuals and animation of the past, without sacrificing factual integrity" by The Independent. But it was criticised by historian Glen Bowersock in The Guardian as being written in "a swashbuckling style that aims more to unsettle his readers than to instruct them ... irresponsible and unreliable".

Dynasty: The Rise and Fall of the House of Caesar (2015) covers the reigns of the five emperors of Rome's Julio-Claudian dynasty, from Augustus to Nero. Classics professor Emily Wilson, reviewing it for The Guardian, was critical of the "overblown style" of Holland's writing and the narrative's lurid details, saying of the book  "this is ancient Rome for the age of Donald Trump". But in his review for The Observer, Nick Cohen wrote "Among the many virtues of Tom Holland's terrific history is that he does not shrink from seeing the Roman emperors for what they were: 'the west's primal examples of tyranny'."

Holland next wrote two short historical biographies. The first, Athelstan: The Making of England (2016), is a part of the 'Penguin Monarchs' series and covers the life of Æthelstan, the 10th-century ruler widely regarded as the first king of England. The second, Æthelflæd: England's Forgotten Founder (2019) is an entry in the Ladybird Expert series and tells of Athelstan's aunt (and daughter of Alfred the Great), Æthelflæd, who ruled the Anglo-Saxon kingdom of Mercia in the early 10th century.

Dominion: The Making of the Western Mind (titled Dominion: How the Christian Revolution Remade the World for the U.S. edition), was published in 2019. It is an examination of Christianity's influence on Western civilisation in which Holland maintains that the religion's influence continues to be seen in ethics and cultural norms throughout the world today, even when the religion itself is rejected: "To live in a western country is to live in a society still utterly saturated by Christian concepts and assumptions." Dominion received positive reviews, with Kirkus Reviews calling it "astute and thoughtful", and Publishers Weekly saying that "entertaining is too light a term and instructive is too heavy a term for a rich work that is enjoyably both". Reviewing it for The Times, Gerard DeGroot argued that much of what Holland attributes to Christian influence is simply humanity evolving the need to work together for survival, but said "I have to commend the originality of this book, not to mention [Holland's] brave ambition."

Other writing
Holland's translation of The Histories by Herodotus, the ancient Greek scholar, was published in 2013. Although Holland had studied Latin in school, his Greek is completely self-taught, and he set himself the task of translating one paragraph of the over-800-page Histories every day until he finished. Kirkus Reviews called his translation "a feast for students of ancient history and budding historians of any period." Classics scholar Edith Hall reviewed it for The Times Literary Supplement and said it was "unquestionably the best English translation of Herodotus to have appeared in the past half-century, and there have been quite a few ... I am in awe of Tom Holland's achievement."

Holland has written dozens of articles for newspapers, journals and websites on varied topics including wildlife conservation, sports, politics and history.  He also writes occasional book reviews for The Guardian.

Holland has also written for the stage. His first play, The Importance of Being Frank, told the story of Oscar Wilde's imprisonment and trial. His second was Death of a Maid, which focused on the life of Joan of Arc. In March 2019, he announced on Twitter that he had written an opera about Cleopatra and it was in the showcase stage of development.

Holland was one of the inaugural contributors to the popular Classics website Antigone.

Radio 
Holland adapted the writings of classical Greek and Roman authors Herodotus, Homer, Thucydides, and Virgil for a series of broadcasts on BBC Radio 4. In 2001, Radio Four also broadcast a dramatic play he wrote based on Thucydides' History of the Peloponnesian War, titled Our Man in Athens. It presented the narrative as that of a veteran war reporter under siege in the studios of Radio Free Athens.

Since 2011, he has been one of the presenters of Radio 4's popular history series Making History.

Television documentaries

Dinosaurs, Myths and Monsters
In February 2011, Holland wrote and presented Dinosaurs, Myths and Monsters, a BBC Four television programme. It explored the influence of fossils on the mythology of various cultures throughout history, including the ancient Greeks and Native Americans.

Islam: The Untold Story

In August 2012, Holland produced and presented a documentary for Channel 4 television titled Islam: The Untold Story, which questioned Islamic doctrine that maintains Muhammad founded the religion in Mecca in the 7th century, and that the Quran was transmitted, in full, directly to Muhammad by Allah (God) via the angel Gabriel, rather than being written by a person or persons. Holland argued that there is very little contemporary historical evidence about the life of Muhammad, with no mention of him at all in historical texts until decades after his death, and no mention of Mecca in any datable text relating to him until over a century after he died. He concluded that it is much more likely that Islamic theology developed gradually over several centuries as the Arab Empire expanded, and that descriptions of Muhammad's home more closely resemble what is now southern Israel than Mecca.

Holland said the program provoked "a firestorm of death threats" against him. Islam: The Untold Story generated more than 1,200 complaints in total to Ofcom and Channel 4, though Ofcom found there was no breach of its broadcasting code to investigate. A planned screening of Islam: The Untold Story before an audience of historians was cancelled, due to security concerns over threats received by Holland as a result of the documentary. Several religious scholars, including Dr. Jenny Taylor, founder of the Lapido Media Centre for Religious Literacy in World Affairs, and Dr. Keith Small of the International Qur'anic Studies Association, defended Holland and the right of historians to critically examine the origin stories of religions.

Writing on the Channel 4 website, Holland responded to the criticism by saying that the origins of Islam is a "legitimate subject of historical enquiry" and that his documentary was "a historical endeavour and is not a critique of one of the major monotheistic religions".

Isis: The Origins of Violence
In 2017, Holland revisited the topic of Islam by writing and presenting another documentary for Channel 4. Isis: The Origins of Violence looked at the militant terror group ISIS and argued that they use Islamic doctrine to inform and justify their quest for a global caliphate.

In the film, Holland visited the site of the 2015 Bataclan theatre massacre in Paris, interviewed a Salafi jihadist leader in Jordan, and then went to the Iraqi city of Sinjar, which had historically been largely populated by the Yazidi minority. In 2014, ISIS forces swept into the city and killed most of the Yazidi men and old women, taking the young women as sex slaves and the young boys to train as ISIS soldiers. At one point, Holland was shown approaching a pit filled with the remains of Yazidi women whom Isis considered too old to be used as sex slaves, and then had to vomit off-camera.

In an interview with the Evening Standard to promote the film, he said "Just as Nazis justified genocide in terms of racial theory, there are Islamic scholars who justify it in terms of what the Koran says. Not to engage with that, to pretend that's not an issue, is essentially to be complicit in genocide." He also said that westerners are wrong to blame their own foreign policy for the existence of ISIS: "We want to believe we have agency. We want to believe it's about foreign policy — because then we can do something about it. But you just have to read Dabiq [the ISIS magazine]. They say upfront: 'We hate you because you're not Muslim'."

Although some Muslim groups once again registered their disapproval of the programme's content and of Channel 4 for airing it, Holland stated their reaction this time was much less severe than with Islam: the Untold Story. Journalist Peter Oborne wrote a rebuttal to it on the website Middle East Eye titled "No, Channel 4: Islam is not responsible for the Islamic State", in which he stated that the 2003 invasion of Iraq is responsible for ISIS, not Islamic teachings. However, The Guardian praised the documentary, saying "ISIS: The Origins of Violence will start many arguments, but we should be grateful for having broadcasters brave and thoughtful enough to make them."

Activism

Conservation
Holland has campaigned and written articles in support of measures to save London's disappearing hedgehog population.

He is a staunch opponent of the proposed Stonehenge road tunnel and other development projects that threaten landscapes around Britain's historic sites and since 2018 has been president of the Stonehenge Alliance, a group dedicated to stopping construction of the tunnel (or at least convincing the government to redesign it from the planned 1.8 miles. in length to a longer, deep bored tunnel of at least 2.8 miles that would be less obtrusive to the World Heritage Site).  In 2017, he said of the Stonehenge tunnel: "The issue is whether Stonehenge exists to provide a tourist experience, or whether it is something more significant, both historically and spiritually.  It has stood there for 4,500 years. And up to now, no one's thought of injecting enormous quantities of concrete into the landscape and permanently disfiguring it."

Politics
In August 2014, Holland and fellow historian Dan Snow organized 200 British public figures in signing a letter to the people of Scotland, published by The Guardian, expressing the hope that Scotland would vote to remain part of the United Kingdom in the September 2014 referendum on that issue. The letter read in part "We want to let you know how very much we value our bonds of citizenship with you, and to express our hope that you will vote to renew them. What unites us is much greater than what divides us. Let's stay together." Among the signatories were Sir Andrew Lloyd Webber, Mick Jagger, Dame Judi Dench and Stephen Hawking.

Earlier that year, he had voiced his desire for the United Kingdom to stay a part of the European Union, saying: "I would like to remain a citizen of the European Union, but I would like even more to continue in a country that includes Scotland ... the likelier it seems the United Kingdom will leave the EU, the likelier Scotland is to leave the United Kingdom. I don't want to be a Little Englander. I want to stay European, and I want to stay British." After Britain voted to leave the EU in 2016, Holland stated that he himself had voted Remain, but that since Brexit had been chosen by the people in a democratic vote, the government had to carry through with it. He posted on his Twitter account in October 2018: "Brexit has to happen – anything else would be undemocratic. But the result was close, close, close – so the Brexit settlement should properly accept that. I'm sure that's what most people feel."

In 2017, Holland joined Scottish businessman/blogger Kevin Hague and history professor Ali Ansari to create a new think tank which they named "These Islands". It is devoted to stimulating positive debate about Britain's identity, Brexit and the Scottish independence issue, and promoting the idea that staying united as a nation is beneficial to all the countries that make up Great Britain. A number of academics and activists have contributed papers to the These Islands website.

In 2019, Holland was a signatory on a public letter to The Guardian denouncing Jeremy Corbyn, leader of the Labour Party and candidate for Prime Minister, for antisemitism. In an article for The Telegraph, he wrote that Corbyn's support for Palestinian activist Raed Salah was particularly offensive to him due to Salah's spread of the blood libel, which originated in England in the 12th century: "England, as the birthplace of this most toxic of lies, has a particular responsibility to take a stand against it. Taking a stand against it, however, is something that Jeremy Corbyn, by backing a promoter of the blood libel, has failed to do."

Yazidi
While filming Isis: Origins of Evil, Holland interviewed Yazidi refugees, survivors of an ethnoreligious population of northern Iraq who in 2014 suffered the mass murder of many of their men and older women, and the kidnapping of their children and young women, by ISIS. In 2017, he wrote an article for The Spectator in which he implored the Western world not to forget the Yazidi. In it, he detailed what ISIS had inflicted upon the Yazidi: "Yazidis [were] shot and thrown like refuse into pits; men and boys beheaded in front of their families; girls as young as eight subjected to gang rape; beatings; forced conversions; torture; slavery. In a camp I visited, a woman who had been raped for an entire year, then shot in the head when her owner grew tired of her, then finally sold back to her husband, lay curled in a foetal ball in a makeshift tent, rocking and moaning to herself." In June 2018, he gave an interview to James Delingpole on the latter's podcast and spoke about Western apathy toward the Yazidi's suffering: "Nobody in the West really gives a shit. And the reason nobody gives a shit, as a Yazidi refugee I spoke to said, is that in the West you have Christians, you have Muslims, you have Jews who all speak up for their co-religionists, but who cares about the Yazidi? Who cares about them?"

In June 2019, he joined several other speakers in addressing an assembly of members of Parliament in the Grand Committee room of the House of Commons, where he spoke about the cruelties inflicted upon the Yazidi.

Antisemitism
Holland has also written about historical antisemitism in England and explained how one can draw a connection between this and more recent antisemitic attitudes expressed by some activists in the British Labour Party when under the leadership of Jeremy Corbyn.

Views

Education
Holland has been a proponent of state education over private, saying in 2014:The wealth that the leading [independent] schools can call upon has become obscene. How can state-funded schools possibly compete with sports fields and state-of-the-art facilities that have seen sport, acting and even popular music dominated by the privately educated? Which said, I am not convinced that the teaching in private schools is any better than in state schools. Our local primary school has teachers as good as any you could hope to meet, and when I compare the start that it has given my children to that given to the prep-school pupils I know, I do not remotely feel that my children have come off second-best. Just the opposite, in fact.

He supported the plan by Secretary of State for Education Michael Gove to spread the teaching of Latin in state schools. saying in 2014: Traditionally, an education in ancient languages has served as a marker of privilege – which is why public schools have always been so keen on providing it. I don't see, though, why children should be deprived of the riches of classical civilisation, just because they are in the state system ... It is not an elitist policy but the precise opposite: impeccably progressive.

Christianity
Although his father is an atheist, Holland was raised in the Christian church by his "devout Anglican" mother, and he said in 2013 that because of her example "I've always associated Anglicanism with goodness and decency and generosity of spirit and compassion, so I never had that visceral association of Christianity or institutional religion with repression or dogma or illiberalism".  Nonetheless, as an adult he disavowed belief in the existence of God, saying "I have seen no evidence that would satisfy me that anything supernatural exists. I have seen no proof for god".

In 2016, he wrote an article titled "Why I Was Wrong About Christianity" for the New Statesman, in which he said that he had come to realise he was incorrect to have thought in the past that his own western values derived from the Greece and Rome of antiquity and owed nothing to Christianity: Familiarity with the biblical narrative of the crucifixion has dulled our sense of just how completely novel a deity Christ was ... [Christianity] is the principal reason why, by and large, most of us who live in post-Christian societies still take for granted that it is nobler to suffer than to inflict suffering. It is why we generally assume that every human life is of equal value. In my morals and ethics, I have learned to accept that I am not Greek or Roman at all, but thoroughly and proudly Christian.

Islam and the Islamic State
He has defended himself from critics who have suggested that his views on Islam and its origins are rooted in Islamophobia, saying that he merely believes Islam should receive the same kind of historical analysis that other religions do. In 2013, he said in an interview with The Daily Telegraph: "Islam is like a shot of caffeine into British culture. It adds a new dimension to the world, it enriches the variety and scope of our intellectual life."

In March 2015, Holland published a piece titled "We must not deny the religious roots of Islamic State" in the New Statesman. It argued that the jihadis of ISIS call themselves Islamic and use text from the Quran to justify their actions, so therefore people like the writer Mehdi Hasan ought not to claim they are not Muslims, as Hasan had in the previous week's issue. Holland wrote that "It is not merely coincidence that ISIS currently boasts a caliph, imposes quranically mandated taxes, topples idols, chops the hands off thieves, stones adulterers, executes homosexuals and carries a flag that bears the Muslim declaration of faith." In 2017, he said "The mistake people make is to replicate Isis's position, which is that there's one, true form of Islam and anyone who deviates from that isn't a Muslim. That's Isis's justification for killing Shia. Ironically, when Western leaders say 'it's nothing to do with Islam', they're doing the same. I don't think it's the business—particularly of non-Muslims—to specify what a Muslim is. If people say they're Muslim, they're Muslim."

In May 2015, Holland gave the inaugural Christopher Hitchens Lecture at the Hay Festival, in which he addressed the subject of De-Radicalising Muhammad. In an interview he gave to the literary website Quadrapheme the following month he explained that he wanted the lecture to promote discussion of the way Muhammad's life is interpreted, arguing that his "mythos lies at the core of what is pernicious in the goings-on of Islamic State and other radicals."

Personal life
Holland married Sadie, now a midwife, on 31 July 1993. The couple have two daughters and live in Brixton, London.

He is the great-nephew of Olympic cyclist Charles Holland, the first Englishman to complete the Tour de France. He is not related to actor Tom Holland.

Holland is a prolific user of the social media site Twitter. He joined the site in January 2011, and as of July 2022, had sent out over 207,000 tweets.

In 2016, Holland was elected a Fellow of the Royal Society of Literature.

He is a keen cricket fan and player and a bowler (fast-medium) for the Authors XI team, which is composed of prominent British writers. He contributed a chapter (about the only time in his years of playing the game that he hit a six, while the Authors XI were playing a team from Eton College) to the book that the team collectively wrote about their first season playing together, The Authors XI: A Season of English Cricket from Hackney to Hambledon (Bloomsbury, 2013). He also wrote an article for the Financial Times about receiving batting training from his cricketing hero, England captain Alastair Cook.

Written works

Series fiction

Fiction

Short fiction

Plays

Non-fiction
 
 
 
 
 
 
 
  Description & arrow-searchable preview.

Translation

Radio broadcasts 
 Our Man in Athens (writer) 30 July 2001, Radio 4
 Making History (presenter) 2011–present, Radio 4

Television broadcasts 
 Dinosaurs, Myth and Monsters (writer and presenter) 14 September 2011, BBC Four
 Islam: The Untold Story (writer and presenter) 28 August 2012, BBC Four
 Isis: Origins of Violence (writer and presenter) 17 May 2017, BBC Four

Podcast

Holland presents a podcast with historian Dominic Sandbrook, called The Rest is History.

References

External links

 
 The Rest is History podcast
 Holland's page , Conville and Walsh literary agents
 These Islands website

1968 births
Living people
Alumni of Queens' College, Cambridge
Alumni of the University of Oxford
British critics of Islam
British writers
English atheists
Fellows of the Royal Society of Literature
History Today people
Islam-related controversies
People educated at Canford School
People educated at Chafyn Grove School
People from Salisbury
English podcasters